One Winter in Eden is a collection of science fiction and fantasy stories by author Michael Bishop.  It was released in 1984 by Arkham House in an edition of 3,596 copies.  It was the author's second book published by Arkham House.

Contents

One Winter in Eden contains the following tales:

 "Introductions", by Thomas M. Disch
 "One Winter in Eden"
 "Seasons of Belief"
 "Cold War Orphans"
 "The Yukio Mishima Cultural Association of Kudzu Valley, Georgia"
 "Out of the Mouths of Olympus"
 "Patriots"
 "Collaborating"
 "Within the Walls of Tyre"
 "The Monkey's Bride"
 "Vernalfest Morning"
 "Saving Face"
 "The Quickening"

Sources

1984 short story collections
Short story collections by Michael Bishop (author)
Fantasy short story collections
Arkham House books